Cychrus jinchuanensis is a species of ground beetle in the subfamily of Carabinae. It was described by Deuve & Tian in 2007.

Northern Hemisphere, with about 115 species (Lorenz 2005: 64–66) in the Nearctic (two western species) and Palaearctic Regions.

References

jinchuanensis
Beetles described in 2007